Beverly W. "Jordy" Walker (7 May 1939 – 11 December 2010 in Hamilton) is a sailor from Bermuda.  Walker represented his country at the 1972 Summer Olympics in Kiel. Walker took 15th place in the Soling with Kirkland Cooper as helmsman and Alex Cooper as fellow crew member.

References

1939 births
2010 deaths
Bermudian male sailors (sport)
Sailors at the 1972 Summer Olympics – Soling
Olympic sailors of Bermuda
People from Hamilton, Bermuda